José Carlos Chagas de Oliveira is a Brazilian paralympic boccia player. He participated at the 2020 Summer Paralympics in the boccia competition, being awarded the bronze medal in the mixed individual BC1 event. He also competed at the 2012 and 2016 Summer Paralympics in the boccia competition.

References

External links 
Paralympic Games profile

Living people
Place of birth missing (living people)
Year of birth missing (living people)
Brazilian boccia players
Boccia players at the 2012 Summer Paralympics
Boccia players at the 2016 Summer Paralympics
Boccia players at the 2020 Summer Paralympics
Medalists at the 2020 Summer Paralympics
Paralympic medalists in boccia
Paralympic boccia players of Brazil
Paralympic bronze medalists for Brazil
21st-century Brazilian people